Joseph Lelang is a Papua New Guinea politician from the People's National Congress and the Member of Parliament for Kandrian-Gloucester District. Since 12 August 2022, he has been Leader of the Opposition.

References 

Living people
Place of birth missing (living people)
Year of birth missing (living people)
Opposition leaders in Papua New Guinea
People's National Congress (Papua New Guinea) politicians
Members of the National Parliament of Papua New Guinea
21st-century Papua New Guinean politicians